Telamoptilia prosacta is a moth of the family Gracillariidae. It is known from Thailand, Taiwan, Indonesia (Java), India (Bihar), Japan (the Ryukyu Islands) and Fiji.

The wingspan is 6.5–8 mm.

The larvae feed on Ipomoea species, including Ipomoea batatas. They mine the leaves of their host plant. It has not been recorded as a severe pest.
In Japan, however, it heavily infested the leaf of sweet potato in Yakusima, the larval leaf-mines having been found on almost all the leaves of the plant in some cultivated fields in autumn.

References

Acrocercopinae
Moths of Asia
Moths of Japan
Moths described in 1918